Guy Clark – Greatest Hits is a compilation album by Texas singer-songwriter Guy Clark.

Track listing
All songs written by Guy Clark except where noted.
 "Texas Cookin'" – 3:50
 "Desperados Waiting for the Train" – 4:31
 "L.A. Freeway" – 4:43
 "She Ain't Goin' Nowhere" – 3:27
 "A Nickel for the Fiddler" – 2:45
 "Broken Hearted People" – 4:45
 "Texas – 1947" – 3:10
 "Let Him Roll" – 4:05
 "The Last Gunfighter Ballad" – 2:51
 "Rita Ballou" – 2:49

Personnel
Guy Clark – vocals, guitar
Mike Leach – bass
Jerry Kroon – drums
Larrie Londin – drums
Chip Young – guitar
Pat Carter – guitar
Steve Gibson – guitar
Jerry Carrigan – drums
 Dick Feller – guitar
Jim Colvard – guitar
Reggie Young – guitar
Hal Rugg – dobro
Jack Hicks – dobro
Hal Rugg – pedal steel guitar
Chuck Cochran – piano
Shane Keister – piano
Johnny Gimble –  fiddle
Mickey Raphael – harmonic
Lea Jane Berinati – background vocals, piano
Rodney Crowell – background vocals
Emmylou Harris – background vocals
Pat Carter – background vocals
Gary B. White – background vocals
Florence Warner – background vocals
Steve Earle – background vocals
Sammi Smith – background vocals
Brian Ahern – guitar
David Briggs – clarinet, piano, keyboards, clavinet, background vocals
Chuck Cochran – piano
Charlie Bundy – bass, background vocals
Susanna Clark – background vocals
Sammi Smith – background vocals
Hoyt Axton – background vocals
Tracy Nelson – background vocals
Nicolette Larson – background vocals
Pete Grant – dobro, pedal steel guitar
Jack Hicks – banjo
Chris Laird – drums, percussion, finger cymbals
Mike Leech – bass, string arrangements
Waylon Jennings – guitar, harmony vocals
Steve Keith – fiddle
Chips Moman – guitar
Danny Roland – guitar, background vocals
Tommy Williams – fiddle
Byron Bach – cello
Jerry Jeff Walker – guitar, background vocals

1983 greatest hits albums
Guy Clark compilation albums
RCA Records compilation albums